Emil Løjborg Kristensen (born 20 September 1992) is a Danish professional ice hockey defenceman. He is currently under contract with HC Pustertal Wölfe of the ICE Hockey League (ICEHL). He previously played with KooKoo in the Finnish Liiga, initially signing a one-year contract with the team in 2017 after playing in the Swedish Hockey League (SHL).

International
Kristensen was named to the Denmark men's national ice hockey team for competition at the 2014, 2015, 2016, 2017 and 2018 IIHF World Championship tournaments.

Career statistics

Regular season and playoffs

International

References

External links
 

1992 births
Living people
Danish ice hockey defencemen
EfB Ishockey players
KooKoo players
Linköping HC players
IK Oskarshamn players
People from Esbjerg
HC Pustertal Wölfe players
Rögle BK players
Schwenninger Wild Wings players
Ice hockey players at the 2022 Winter Olympics
Olympic ice hockey players of Denmark
Sportspeople from the Region of Southern Denmark